Bertha Hirsch Baruch was a German born American writer, social worker, and suffragist.

Baruch was born in the Province of Posen, Germany. She immigrated to New London, Connecticut with her father in 1876. Baruch wrote poetry in her teens and was encouraged by Rose Hawthorne Lathrop in her literary efforts.  Active in College Settlement and university extension work, she attended Pennsylvania University and Yale. She later worked on the editorial staff for the Los Angeles Times.  In 1906 she lived at 1168 W. 36th St., Los Angeles, California.

Baruch was active in the women's suffrage movement. She became the county president of the Los Angeles Suffrage Association in 1905 when two conventions were hosted:
the Women’s Parliament, October 10–11, and
the county convention of the Equal Suffrage League October 12. 

In 1908 Baruch became the treasurer of the Los Angeles Jewish Women’s Foreign Relief Association. She published Dress as a Social Factor in 1912.

References

The California Birthday Book
Knoles, Tully C. "What Is Nationality?" Annual Publication of the Historical Society of Southern California 10, no. 3 (1917): 5-12. Accessed March 22, 2020. doi:10.2307/41168739.

American women poets
Year of birth missing 
Year of death missing
American suffragists
German emigrants to the United States
Writers from Los Angeles
Writers from Poznań
Activists from California
German people of Jewish descent
American people of Jewish descent
German writers
German suffragists